Windsor is the name of some places in the U.S. state of Illinois:
Windsor, Mercer County, Illinois
Windsor, Shelby County, Illinois

es:Windsor (Illinois)